Crystal Beach is an unincorporated community in the census-designated place of Palm Harbor in Pinellas County, Florida, United States.

The United States Postal Service operates the Crystal Beach Post Office at 420 Crystal Beach Avenue. Residents of Crystal Beach do not have home mail delivery; they travel to the post office to send and receive mail.

References

Crystal Beach Florida lies along the shore of St Joseph's Sound, just west of Palm Harbor. This beautiful little community is home to Live Oak Park and a lovely fishing pier. The Pinellas Trail runs through Crystal Beach, connecting north and south Pinellas County for bikers and those who enjoy long walks in our tropical paradise.

This little community is convenient to all you could possibly need, yet far enough removed from the action that you feel you are living in the Florida of the 1950s! A wonderful place to live and play in the Florida sun!

Unincorporated communities in Pinellas County, Florida
Unincorporated communities in Florida